National Route 208 is a national highway of Japan connecting Chūō-ku, Kumamoto and Saga, Saga in Japan, with a total length of 84.7 km (52.63 mi).

References

National highways in Japan
Roads in Fukuoka Prefecture
Roads in Kumamoto Prefecture
Roads in Saga Prefecture